Zhang Liangliang (born 1 October 1982) is a Chinese foil fencer. He competed in the men's team foil competition at the 2012 Summer Olympics.

References

1982 births
Living people
Chinese male fencers
Chinese male foil fencers
Olympic fencers of China
Fencers at the 2012 Summer Olympics
Fencers from Anhui
Fencers at the 2006 Asian Games
Fencers at the 2010 Asian Games
Asian Games gold medalists for China
Asian Games bronze medalists for China
Medalists at the 2006 Asian Games
Medalists at the 2010 Asian Games
Asian Games medalists in fencing
Universiade medalists in fencing
People from Bengbu
Universiade gold medalists for China
Medalists at the 2003 Summer Universiade